Temno (Darkness) is a Czech historical novel, written by Alois Jirásek. It was first published in 1915.

References

1915 novels
Historical novels
Novels by Alois Jirásek
Novels set in the 18th century